Global information management Metrics eXchange or GMX is a collection of current and proposed standards, primarily targeted at the needs of the translation industry. They are concerned with measuring quantitatively aspects of a document, particularly those with relevance to the translation process (e.g. word counts, complexity) and were being standardised by Localization Industry Standards Association as part of the Open Architecture for XML Authoring and Localization until the demise of LISA. The primary use cases are in quoting, estimating and billing translation work.

GMX-Volume

GMX-V is the first of the three standards to be completed, it forms part of the Open Architecture for XML Authoring and Localization reference architecture and attempts to measure volume in two ways:
 Establish a verifiable way of calculating the primary word and character counts for a given electronic document.
 Establish a specific XML vocabulary that enables the automatic exchange of metric data

An open source implementation of the GMX/V standard, provided by Gould Tech Solutions, is available at https://code.google.com/p/gmx-v/.

GMX-Complexity

GMX-Quality

References

External links
GMX-V page on the LISA OSCAR web site
GMX-V specification

Technical communication
XML
XML-based standards
Markup languages